Jabłonka  is a village in Nowy Targ County, Lesser Poland Voivodeship, in southern Poland, close to the border with Slovakia. It is the seat of the gmina (administrative district) called Gmina Jabłonka. The village has a population of 4,400.

The village lies in the drainage basin of the Black Sea (through Orava, Váh and Danube rivers), in the historical region of Orava.

History
The area became part of Poland in the 10th or early 11th century, and later it passed to Hungary. In the late 19th century, Jabłonka had a predominantly Polish population. It became again part of Poland following World War I.

Notable people
 Andrzej Dziubek (born 1954), Polish musician and vocalist

References

Villages in Nowy Targ County